Giovan Battista Adonnino (6 November 1889, Licata - 14 December 1973) was an Italian politician belonging to the Christian Democracy. He was elected member of the Constituent Assembly of Italy and of the Chamber of Deputies.

References
ADONNINO Giovan Battista

1889 births
1973 deaths
People from Licata
Christian Democracy (Italy) politicians
Members of the Constituent Assembly of Italy
Deputies of Legislature I of Italy
Politicians from the Province of Agrigento